A hypermarket (sometimes called a hyperstore, supercentre or superstore) is a big-box store combining a supermarket and a department store. The result is an expansive retail facility carrying a wide range of products under one roof, including full grocery lines and general merchandise. In theory, hypermarkets allow customers to satisfy all their routine shopping needs in one trip. The term hypermarket was coined in 1968 by French trade expert Jacques Pictet.

Hypermarkets, like other big-box stores, typically have business models focusing on high-volume, low-margin sales. Because of their large footprints, many hypermarkets choose suburban or out-of-town locations that are easily accessible by automobile.

History

Canada
Loblaws established its Real Canadian Superstore chain in 1979. It sells mainly groceries, while also retailing clothing, electronics and housewares. Its largest competitor in Canada is Walmart. These are the two major Canadian hypermarkets.

Europe

The first European hypermarket is commonly mistaken to be the Carrefour store that opened in 1963, at Sainte-Geneviève-des-Bois, France, The co-founders were influenced by the teachings of Colombian-born American marketing executive Bernardo Trujillo, who taught executive education as part of the NCR Corporation's marketing campaign. However, the Belgian retailer Grand Bazar preceded Carrefour by two years when it opened three hypermarkets in a short span in 1961 under the name SuperBazar after Belgian law restricting the size of department stores was abolished in January 1961. The substantially larger store that opened a week later in Auderghem, Brussels, covering , is regarded as a more proper hypermarket that brought the concept to fruition. It was Belgian market development engineer , who adopted the concept from his frequent trips to the United States, particularly inspired from the Grand Union's "Grand Way" center in Paramus, New Jersey.

In France, hypermarkets are generally situated in shopping centers outside cities, though some are present in the city center. They are surrounded by extensive car parking facilities, and generally by other specialized superstores that sell clothing, sports gear, automotive items, etc.

After the successes of super- and hyper-markets and amid fears that smaller stores would be forced out of business, France enacted laws that made it more difficult to build hypermarkets and also restricted the amount of economic leverage that hypermarket chains can impose upon their suppliers (the Loi Galland).

Japan
The predecessor to Ito Yokado was founded in 1920 selling western goods, went public in 1957, and switched to that name in 1965. Seibu Department Stores was founded in 1956, and opened up its grocery chain Seiyu Group in 1963. Isao Nakauchi founded the first Daiei in Kobe in 1957, selling clothing, electronics, furniture and groceries all in one store. Jusco was created in 1970, and eventually became known as ÆON.

In Japanese, hypermarkets are known as 総合スーパー (Sougou Suupaa, General Merchandise Stores). There is a distinction in Japanese between スーパー (Supers) and デパート (Departs) with the former being discounters, but the latter selling luxury brand clothing and quite often high-end groceries as well.

Hypermarkets may be found in urban areas as well as less populated areas. The Japanese government encourages hypermarket installations, as mutual investment by financial stocks are a common way to run hypermarkets. Japanese hypermarkets may contain restaurants, manga (Japanese comic) stands, Internet cafes, typical department store merchandise, a full range of groceries, beauty salons and other services all in the same store. A recent trend has been to combine the dollar store concept with the hypermarket blueprint, giving rise to the "hyakkin plaza"—hyakkin (百均) or hyaku en (百円) means 100 yen (roughly 1 US dollar).

United States

Until the 1980s, large stores combining food and non-food items were unusual in the United States, although early predecessors existed since the first half of the 20th century.

The Pacific Northwest chain Fred Meyer, now a division of the Kroger supermarket company, opened the first suburban one-stop shopping center in 1931 in the Hollywood District of Portland, Oregon. The store's innovations included a grocery store alongside a drugstore plus off-street parking and an automobile lubrication and oil service. In 1933, men's and women's wear was added, and automotive department, housewares, and other nonfood products followed in succeeding years. In the mid 1930s, Fred Meyer opened a central bakery, a candy kitchen, an ice cream plant, and a photo-finishing plant, which supplied the company's stores in Portland and neighbouring cities with house brands such as Vita Bee bread, Hocus Pocus desserts, and Fifth Avenue candies.

The Midwest (then grocery) chain Meijer, which today operates about 235 stores in six US states, coined the term "super center", and opened the first of its hypermarket format store in Grand Rapids, Michigan, in June 1962, under the brand name "Thrifty Acres".

In the late 1980s and early 1990s, the three major US discount store chains – Walmart, Kmart and Target – started developing similar format chains. Wal-Mart (as it was known before its late-2000s rebranding as Walmart) introduced Hypermart USA in 1987, followed by Wal-Mart Supercenter and Auchan in 1988; Kmart opened its first Super Kmart (originally called Kmart Super Center) in 1991; and Target came with the first Target Greatland stores in 1990, followed by the larger SuperTarget stores in 1995. Most Greatland stores have since been converted to SuperTarget stores, while some have been converted into regular Target stores with the exception of 2 entrances (one example of this is the Antioch, California location).

In the early 1990s, US hypermarkets also began selling fuel. The idea was first introduced in the 1960s, when a number of supermarket chains and retailers like Sears tried to sell fuel, but it didn't generate sufficient consumer interest at the time. Today there are approximately 4,500 hypermarket stores in the US selling fuel, representing an estimated  sold each year.

Australia 
In Australia, Hypermarkets were at their peak during the 1980's. This was especially prevalent during the era of South African owned Pick n Pay Stores and a now discontinued format of Kmart Australia Stores known as Super Kmart. This trend in the Australian market soon lost its appeal into the 1990's. Super Kmart stores were discontinued and Coles Supermarkets and Kmart Stores opened in the former location. Pick n Pay continued to operate in Australia until the 2000's when their locations at Aspley and Sunnybank Hills were converted into Coles Supermarkets and Kmart Department Stores. 

As of 2022, the only Hypermarket or Big-Box Store operational in Australia are Costco Wholesale Warehouses with currently thirteen stores in Australia - four stores in Melbourne, three stores in Sydney, two stores in Brisbane and one store each in Newcastle, Canberra, Adelaide and Perth, with construction underway on the fourteenth store in Queensland's Gold Coast. There were plans for German Hypermarket company Kaufland to open stores in Australia announced in 2019; these plans were cancelled in 2020.

Size

Future
Despite its success, the hypermarket business model may be under threat from online shopping and the shift towards customization according to analysts like Sanjeev Sanyal, Deutsche Bank's Global Strategist, until 2015. Sanyal has argued that some developing countries such as India may omit the hypermarket stage and directly go online.

Warehouse club

Another category of stores sometimes included in the hypermarket category are the membership-based wholesale warehouse clubs that are popular in North America, pioneered by Fedco and today including Sam's Club, a division of Walmart; Costco, in which Carrefour owned some shares from 1985 to 1996; BJ's Wholesale Club on the East Coast; and Clubes City Club in Mexico. In Europe, Makro (owned by METRO AG) leads the market.

However, warehouse clubs differ from hypermarkets in that they have sparse interior decor and require paid membership. In addition, warehouse clubs usually sell bigger packages and have fewer choices in each category of items.

See also 

 List of hypermarkets
 Types of retail outlets
Shelf-ready packaging

References

Bibliography

External links
 

Food retailers
 
Retail formats